Real Torino HC is an ice hockey team in Turin, Italy. They played in the Serie A2. The club was founded in 2001, and were promoted to the Serie A2 in 2008.

External links
 Official site

Turin
Ice hockey clubs established in 2001
Sport in Turin
2001 establishments in Italy